Sylvia Roll (born 29 May 1973) was a German female volleyball player. She was part of the Germany women's national volleyball team. In 1996 and 1997 she became the German Volleyball Player of the Year.

She competed with the national team at the 2000 Summer Olympics in Sydney, Australia, finishing 6th. She played at the 2002 FIVB Volleyball Women's World Championship in Germany. On club level she played with Vini Monte Schiavo Jesi.

See also
 Germany at the 2000 Summer Olympics

References

External links
 
www.cev.lu
www.svz.de
www.otz.de
volleyball.de
Getty Images
YouTube

1973 births
Living people
German women's volleyball players
Sportspeople from Schwerin
Volleyball players at the 2000 Summer Olympics
Olympic volleyball players of Germany